The NORCECA qualification for the 2014 FIVB Volleyball Men's World Championship saw member nations compete for five places at the finals in Poland.

Draw
39 of the 41 NORCECA national teams entered qualification. The teams were distributed according to their position in the NORCECA Senior Men's Confederation Rankings as of 15 January 2012 using the serpentine system for their distribution. (Rankings shown in brackets) Teams ranked 1–6 do not compete in the first and second rounds, and automatically qualify for the third round.

First round (AFECAVOL)

First round (CAZOVA)

First round (ECVA)

Second round

Third round

The sixteen remaining teams were distributed according to their position in second round and then in the NORCECA Senior Men's Confederation Rankings as of January 2014 using the serpentine system for their distribution. (Positions in second round and NORCECA rankings shown in brackets)

Final round

First round

Pool A
Venue:  International School Auditorium, Willemstad, Curaçao
Dates: December 1–2, 2012
All times are Atlantic Standard Time (UTC−04:00)

Preliminary round

Final round

3rd place

Final

Final standing

Pool B
Venue:  Beausejour Indoor Stadium, Gros Islet, Saint Lucia
Dates: April 27–29, 2012
All times are Atlantic Standard Time (UTC−04:00)

Preliminary round

Final round

Semifinals

3rd place

Final

Final standing

Pool C
Venue:  Pabellón de Voleibol, Santo Domingo, Dominican Republic
Dates: November 3–4, 2012
All times are Atlantic Standard Time (UTC−04:00)

Preliminary round

Final round

3rd place

Final

Final standing

Pool D
Venue:  Omnisports Hall, Marigot, Saint Martin
Dates: August 31 – September 2, 2012
All times are Atlantic Standard Time (UTC−04:00)

Pool E
Venue:  Clifton Hunter High School Sports Center, Grand Cayman, Cayman Islands
Dates: October 6–7, 2012
All times are Eastern Standard Time (UTC−05:00)

Preliminary round

Final round

3rd place

Final

Final standing

Pool F
Venue:  Multi-Purpose Sports Complex, Road Town, British Virgin Islands
Dates: June 7–8, 2012
All times are Atlantic Standard Time (UTC−04:00)

Preliminary round

Final round

3rd place

Final

Final standing

Pool G
Venue:  Gimnasio Nacional José Adolfo Pineda, San Salvador, El Salvador
Dates: May 18–20, 2012
All times are Central Standard Time (UTC−06:00)

Pool H
Venue:  Gimnasio Nacional, San José, Costa Rica
Dates: July 27–29, 2012
All times are Central Standard Time (UTC−06:00)

Second round

Pool I
Venue:  Omnisports Hall, Marigot, Saint Martin
Dates: August 10–11, 2013
All times are Atlantic Standard Time (UTC−04:00).

Preliminary round

Final round

3rd place

Final

Final standing

Pool J
Venue:  Beausejour Indoor Stadium, Gros Islet, Saint Lucia
Dates: April 27–28, 2013
All times are Atlantic Standard Time (UTC−04:00)

Preliminary round

Final round

3rd place

Final

Final standing

Pool K
Venue:  Multi-Purpose Sports Complex, Road Town, British Virgin Islands
Dates: July 27–28, 2013
All times are Atlantic Standard Time (UTC−04:00)

Preliminary round

Final round

3rd place

Final

Final standing

Pool L
Venue:  Centro Deportivo Betico Croes, Santa Cruz, Aruba
Dates: May 18–19, 2013
All times are Atlantic Standard Time (UTC−04:00)

Preliminary round

Final round

3rd place

Final

Final standing

Pool M
Venue:  Ismay van Wilgen Sports Hall, Paramaribo, Suriname
Dates: June 15–16, 2013
All times are Suriname Time (UTC−03:00)

Preliminary round

Final round

3rd place

Final

Final standing

Pool N
Venue:  Hall Paul Chonchon, Pointe-à-Pitre, Guadeloupe
Dates: June 15–16, 2013
All times are Atlantic Standard Time (UTC−04:00)

Preliminary round

Final round

3rd place

Final

Final standing

Second placed teams

Third round

Pool O
Venue:  OTC Sports Center I, Colorado Springs, United States
Dates: May 15–18, 2014
All times are Mountain Daylight Time (UTC−06:00)

Preliminary round

Final round

3rd place

Final

Final standing

Pool P
Venue:  Coliseo de la Ciudad Deportiva, Havana, Cuba
Dates: May 21–24, 2014
All times are Cuba Daylight Time (UTC−04:00)

Preliminary round

Final round

3rd place

Final

Final standing

Pool Q
Venue:  Hershey Centre, Mississauga, Canada
Dates: May 16–19, 2014
All times are Eastern Daylight Time (UTC−04:00)

Preliminary round

Final round

3rd place

Final

Final standing

Pool R
Venue:  Auditorio Juan Pachín Vicéns, Ponce, Puerto Rico
Dates: May 22–25, 2014
All times are Atlantic Standard Time (UTC−04:00)

Preliminary round

Final round

3rd place

Final

Final standing

Final round

Playoff
Venue:  Coliseo Guillermo Angulo, Carolina, Puerto Rico
Dates: July 17–20, 2014
All times are Atlantic Standard Time (UTC−04:00)

Preliminary round

Final round

3rd place

Final

Final standing

References

External links
Official website of the Third and Final Round
Official website of the Second Round
Official website of the First Round

2014 FIVB Volleyball Men's World Championship
2012 in volleyball
2013 in volleyball
2014 in volleyball